Marco Frascari (1945 – June 2, 2013) was an Italian architect and architectural theorist. He was born in Mantua, in northern Italy, in 1945. He studied with Carlo Scarpa and Arrigo Rudi at Università Iuav di Venezia and received his PhD in Architecture from the University of Pennsylvania. He taught for several years at the University of Pennsylvania, then as Visiting Professor at Columbia and Harvard. He served as G. Truman Ward Professor of Architecture at Virginia Tech from 1998 to 2005. In 2005, he became director of the David Azrieli School of Architecture and Urbanism at Carleton University in Ottawa, Canada.   Marco Frascari died in Ottawa on June 2, 2013 after a protracted illness.

Publications
 Eleven Exercises in the Art of Architectural Drawing: Slow Food for the Architect's Imagination (2011) Routledge
 Monsters of Architecture (1991)download .pdf
 "The Tell-the-Tale-Detail" (1981)
 "Una Pillola per sognare ... una casa" (1996)
 "Due Anni di Esperienze dello Studio Estivo dell' Universita della Pennsylvania In Mantova" (1994)
 "Architects, never eat your maccheroni without a proper sauce! A macaronic meditation on the anti-Cartesian nature of architectural imagination" Nordic Journal of Architectural Research
 "Foreword to Alfonso Corona-Martinez' The Architectural Project,2002
 "A tradition of architectural figures: a search for Vita Beata" in Body and Building: Essays on the Changing Relation of Body and Architecture. George Dodds and Robert Tavernor, eds. 2002.

References

External links
Collection at Architectural Archives of the University of Pennsylvania
Alumni profile - Pennsylvania State University
World Trade Center Site Memorial Competition entry
Architectural Maccheroni Article
The Well Temperate Drawings of a reflective Architect Article
"Architectural Synestesia: a hypothesis on the makeup of Scarpa's modernist architectural drawings" Article
"A Light, Six-Sided, Pari Site
 Canadian Cosmopoiesis: Meditations on Cuisine and Architecture
Marco Frascari's Zibaldone

1945 births
2013 deaths
Italian architecture writers
Italian male non-fiction writers
Academic staff of Carleton University
Virginia Tech faculty
University of Pennsylvania School of Design alumni
Harvard University staff